A legend is a historical narrative, a symbolic representation of folk belief.

Legend(s) or The Legend(s) may also refer to:

Narrative
 Urban legend, a widely repeated story of dubious truth
 A fictitious identity used in espionage

Books, comic books, and theatre
 Legend (Gemmell novel), a 1984 fantasy novel by David Gemmell
 Legend (comic imprint), a comic book brand name
 Legend (Lu novel), the first novel in Legend: The Series: a trilogy by Marie Lu
 Legend (play), a 1976 Broadway play by Samuel A. Taylor
 Legend Books, an imprint of Random House
 Legends (comics), comic  book limited series published by DC Comics
 Legends (book), a 1998 collection of short novels edited by Robert Silverberg
 Legends II (book), a 2003 second collection
 Legends!, a 1986 stage play by James Kirkwood, Jr.
 Dragonlance Legends, trilogy of books central to the Dragonlance series
 The Legend, a 1969 novel by Evelyn Anthony

Film
 Legend (1985 film), a fantasy film starring Tom Cruise, Mia Sara and Tim Curry
 The Legend (2012 film), directed by Christian Lara featuring Barry Primus
 Legend (2014 film), an Indian film starring Nandamuri Balakrishna, Sonal Chauhan and Radhika Apte
 Legend (2015 film), a biographical film of the Kray Twins, starring Tom Hardy and Emily Browning
 The Legend (2022 film), an Indian science-fiction film
 Fong Sai-yuk (film) (The Legend), and its sequel, Fong Sai-yuk II

Television
 Legend (TV series), a 1995 science fiction Western television show
 "The Legend" (Prison Break), a 2008 episode of Prison Break
 "Legend" (NCIS), a 2009 two-part episode of NCIS, that served as the backdoor pilot for NCIS: Los Angeles
 The Legend (TV series), a Korean TV series
 Legends of the Hidden Temple (often nicknamed "Legends"), an American game show that ran from 1993 to 1995
 "Legends" (Justice League), a two-part episode of the animated series Justice League
 Legends (TV series), a 2014 American crime drama television series, based on the 2005 Robert Littell book
 Legends of Tomorrow, a 2016 series from DC Entertainment and The CW
  The Legends (TV series), a 2019 Chinese romance
 Marvel Studios: Legends, a 2021 series from Marvel Studios
 MasterChef: Legends, the eleventh season (2021) of FOX's reality culinary show MasterChef
 Legend (television channel), a British TV channel which replaced the Horror Channel.

Music
 The Legend (opera), a 1919 one-act tragic opera by a composer

Albums
 Legend (Bob Marley and the Wailers album), 1984
 Lennon Legend, a posthumous album of greatest hits of John Lennon
 Legend (Robin of Sherwood soundtrack), by Irish group Clannad
 Legend (Tangerine Dream soundtrack), the soundtrack to the 1985 film
 Legend (Henry Cow album), 1973
 Legend (Legend Seven album), 1992
 Legend (Lynyrd Skynyrd album), 1987
 Legend (Poco album), 1978
 Legend (Two Steps from Hell album), 2008
 Legend (film score), a film score by Jerry Goldsmith, for the 1985 film Legend
 Legend (Witchcraft album), 2012
 Legend (House of Pain EP), 1994
 Legend (Abigail Williams EP), 2006
 Legend, the title of three different albums by rockabilly band Legend, fronted by Mickey Jupp
 Legends (Above the Law album), a 1998 album
 Legends (Benny Carter album), 1993
 Legends (Bob Catley album), a 1999 album
 Legends (Beverley Craven album), a 2005 album
 Legends (Five Star album), a 2005 album
 Legends (Dvořák), orchestral composition by Antonín Dvořák
 The Legend (Count Basie album), 1961
 The Legend (Joe Cocker album), 1992
 The Legend (Johnny Cash box set), a 2005 album by Johnny Cash

Songs
 "Legend" (Tchaikovsky), composition by Tchaikovsky, 1883
 "Legend" (Drake song), 2015
 "Legend" (Mika Nakashima song), 2004
 "Legend", by Attila from Chaos, 2016
 "Legend", by Chronixx from Chronology, 2017
 "Legend", by Dance Gavin Dance from Instant Gratification, 2015
 "Legend", by G-Eazy from The Beautiful & Damned, 2017
 "Legend", by House of Pain from Legend, 1994
 "Legend", by Mike Oldfield from the B-side of "Pictures in the Dark", 1985
 "Legend", by Poco from Legend, 1978
 "Legend", by Snoop Dogg from Coolaid, 2016
 "Legend", by Twenty One Pilots from Trench, 2018
 "Legend", by Upchurch from King of Dixie, 2017
 "The Legend", by Jerry Reed for Smokey and the Bandit, 1977
 "The Legend", by Pallbearer from Sorrow and Extinction, 2012
 "The Legend", a 2018 track by Toby Fox from Deltarune Chapter 1 OST from the video game Deltarune
 "Legends" (Juice Wrld song), 2018
 "Legends" (Kelsea Ballerini song), 2017
 "Legends", by The Afters from Live On Forever, 2016
 "Legends", by Sleeping with Sirens from Gossip, 2017

Bands and labels
 Legend, original name of Christian rock band Legend Seven 
 Legend, a rockabilly band fronted by Mickey Jupp
 LEGEND (Icelandic band), Icelandic rock band
 The Legend (band), South Korean band
 The Legend!, a band based around Everett True which has also included Alan McGee
 The Legends, a band of Sam McCue before forming Crowfoot
 The Legends, one of several early bands of Gram Parsons
 The Legends, first band of Dan Hartman
 The Legends (Swedish band)
 The Legends (Tejano band)
 Legends Drum and Bugle Corps, an Open Class Corps based in Portage, Michigan

Games
 Legend (Magic: The Gathering), cards used in the game Magic: The Gathering
 Legends (Magic: The Gathering), expansion to the Magic: The Gathering collectible card game
 Legends (PBM), play-by-mail game moderated by Harlequin Games

Video games
 Legend (1992 video game), for the PC, Atari ST and Commodore Amiga
 Legend (1994 video game), for the Super Nintendo Entertainment System
 Burnout Legends, a 2005 Burnout video game
 Tomb Raider: Legend, a 2006 video game
 Rayman Legends, a 2013 platform game
 Asphalt 9: Legends, a 2018 Asphalt video game

Transport

Aircraft
 Aeropilot Legend 540, a Czech ultralight aircraft
 Turbine Legend, a US kit monoplane

Cars
 Honda Legend, a Honda car model now marketed as Acura RL
 Acura Legend, another car marketed as Honda Legend outside North America
 Mahindra Legend, a four-wheel-drive vehicle
 Legends car racing, a motor racing series base on 1930s and 1940s American automobiles

Motorcycles
 Triumph Legend TT, a 4 stroke-engined motorcycle from Triumph

Boats
 Legend, brand name used in Europe by American boat manufacturer Hunter Marine
 Carnival Legend, a 2001 Spirit class cruise ship operated by Carnival Cruise Line
 Legend Boats, a brand name Canadian manufacturer of fishing and pontoon boats

People
 Bill Legend (born 1944), English musician, drummer for T. Rex 
 John Legend (born 1978), singer, songwriter, musician and actor
 Johnny Legend (born 1948), rockabilly musician, film producer, actor and wrestling manager
 The Legend! (born 1961), name used by the musician and music journalist Everett True
 Tobi Legend (born 1942), soul and gospel singer

Other uses
 Legend, Alberta, an unincorporated community in Alberta, Canada
 Legend (map), a guide to a map's symbology
 Legend (chart), a guide to colours and symbols used in a data chart, graph, plot or diagram
 Legend (numismatics), a formal inscription such as is found around the margin of a coin or seal
 <LEGEND>, an HTML element used to create a frame around other elements
 Legend Entertainment, a former American computer game developer
 Legend Group Ltd., the former name of the Lenovo Group, a Chinese technology company
 LEGEND, a brand of fur of the American Legend Cooperative
 HTC Legend, a smartphone by the HTC Corporation
 Legends Hospitality,  a food, beverage, merchandise retail and stadium operations corporation owned by Jerry Jones and Yankee Global Enterprises
 The Legend (roller coaster), a roller coaster at Holiday World in Santa Claus, Indiana
 Legends Outlets Kansas City, a super-regional shopping mall
 Star Wars Legends, an alternate, decanonized continuity in the Star Wars franchise

See also
 Legendary (disambiguation)
 Legende (disambiguation)